This is a list of cities, towns and village flags in the Netherlands. The flags are listed per province.

Drenthe

Historical

Flevoland

Friesland

Historical

Gelderland

Historical

Groningen

Historical

Limburg

Historical

North Brabant

Historical

North Holland

Historical

Overijssel

Historical

South Holland

Historical

Utrecht

Historical

Zeeland

Historical

See also 
 List of municipal flags of the Netherlands
 List of former municipal flags of the Netherlands

Notes

References

External links
Dorp- en stadsvlaggen